Kate Mason is a British sports journalist and broadcaster.

Personal life
Mason grew up in the village of Oundle in North Northamptonshire. Her mother was an English teacher and Mason read English Literature at Cambridge University. She decided to pursue a career in sports journalism after being inspired by female journalists such as Clare Balding at the 2012 Summer Olympics and Jacqui Oatley on Match of the Day. Her mother is a Wolverhampton Wanderers fan but like her father, Mason is a fan of Tottenham Hotspur.

Career
Mason started sports reporting reporting on Squash and was featured in The Daily Star and Metro newspapers, she joined a training scheme at the BBC in which roles included working on BBC Radio London and BBC Radio 5 sports comedy panel show Fighting Talk, a show she would later appear on numerous times as a guest, and as presenter Colin Murray noted, the first member of staff to come back and win.

Mason worked for ITN, TalkSPORT, and for beIN Sports in Doha. She joined The Football Ramble as a regular host in 2020 alongside Jules Breach, Andy Brassell and Vithushan Ehantharajah. As well as hosting regular shows Mason presents the  Football Ramble Book Club and interview show  The Drop In, for which Mason interviews a special guest, such as former England manager Glenn Hoddle. Her audio documentary "Inside the Qatar World Cup" for the Football Ramble won a bronze award at the British Sports Journalism Awards in March 2023.

From 2019 to 2021 Mason was a presenter on  Sky Sports News. She has also appeared as a guest on The Guardian’s Football Weekly, and presented on Rangers TV, and guest presented the television highlights of the English Football league on Quest.

References

Living people
British women journalists
British women television journalists
Women sports journalists
People from Oundle
Year of birth missing (living people)